Pengzhou, formerly Peng County or Pengxian, is a county-level city of Sichuan Province, Southwest China, it is under the administration of the prefecture-level city of Chengdu. There is an expressway that connects Pengzhou to Chengdu. It is bordered by the prefecture-level divisions of Deyang to the northeast and the Ngawa Tibetan and Qiang Autonomous Prefecture to the north.

It has an area of 1420 square kilometers and a population of 795,900 in 2021. Pengzhou is famous for being one of the three national bases of peony plantation and one of the five national bases of vegetable plantation and merchandise. Pengzhou's industry varies from pharmaceutical to petrochemical. The newly built oil refinery attracts a total investment of 38 billion yuan, considered to be the biggest single investment of Sichuan Province since 1949. Like other regions around the area, Pengzhou was badly affected by the 2008 Sichuan earthquake.

Administrative divisions
Pengzhou has 13 towns（since 2021）:

Tianpeng (天彭街道)
Longfeng (隆丰街道)
Mengyang (濛阳街道)
Zhihe (致和街道)
Longmenshan (龙门山镇)
Lichun (丽春镇)
Jiuchi (九尺镇)
Tongji (通济镇)
Danjingshan (丹景山镇)
Aoping (敖平镇)
Guihua (桂花镇)
Bailu (白鹿镇)
Gexianshan (葛仙山镇)

History
The Pengzhou area is believed to have been inhabited since the Western Zhou period.  Empress dowager Wu Zetian first set up Pengzhou in 686 AD (Tang Dynasty).  In 1337 AD, Hongwu Emperor (Ming Dynasty) reduced Pengzhou to Pengxian, or Peng County.  Peng County later became Pengzhou City in 1993.

As of late, Pengzhou is still occasionally referred to as Pengxian, or Peng County, even in official publications.

Education
Xihua University Pengzhou Campus is located at the south part of the city.

Sister cities
  Ishikari, Hokkaidō, Japan (Since 2000)
  Tondabayashi, Osaka, Japan (Since 2002)
  Anykščiai, Lithuania

Climate

References

External links
Pengzhou Government official website

 
County-level cities in Sichuan
Geography of Chengdu